Nyctimystes purpureolatus is a species of frog in the subfamily Pelodryadinae. It is endemic to New Guinea and is known from its type locality on the Tiri River, a small tributary of the Mamberamo River in West Papua, Indonesia, and from three locations in West Sepik Province, Papua New Guinea.

Description
Adult males measure  in snout–vent length; no females were included in the type series. The body is relatively slender. The snout is truncate. The tympanum is moderately large, obscured dorsally by the supratympanic fold. The fingers and the toes have prominent discs. The fingers have moderate webbing; the toes have more extensive webbing. The dorsum is entirely light green. The limbs have prominent white dermal folds. The lower lip has indistinct white labial stripe, and the eye is surrounded by a white ring. The lateral surfaces of the body are light purple with extensive cream blotching in between. The limbs have partly purple lateral surfaces.
to purple.

The male advertisement call is a distinctly pulsed note emitted in very long series. The dominant frequency is 1720–1890 Hz.

Habitat and conservation
The type series was collected from a shallow swamp in primary lowland rainforest.

Threats to this species are unknown.

References

purpureolatus
Endemic fauna of New Guinea
Amphibians of Western New Guinea
Amphibians of Papua New Guinea
Amphibians described in 2007
Taxa named by Paul M. Oliver
Taxobox binomials not recognized by IUCN